The Lord  Chief Justice of Northern Ireland is a judge who is the appointed official holding office as President of the Courts of Northern Ireland and is head of the Judiciary of Northern Ireland. The present Lord Chief Justice of Northern Ireland is Dame Siobhan Keegan. Her counterpart in England and Wales is the Lord Chief Justice of England and Wales, and in Scotland her equivalent is the Lord President of the Court of Session. The position was established with the creation of Northern Ireland in 1922, and was preceded by the position of Lord Chief Justice of Ireland prior to the partition of Ireland.

Background
The Lord Chief Justice of Northern Ireland holds the office of President of the courts of Northern Ireland and is head of the judiciary of Northern Ireland.

The Lord Chief Justice is responsible for representing the views of the judiciary of Northern Ireland to government, for the maintenance of appropriate arrangements for the welfare, training and guidance of the judiciary of Northern Ireland, and for the maintenance of appropriate arrangements for the deployment of the judiciary of Northern Ireland and the allocation of work within courts.

The Lord Chief Justice is president of the Court of Appeal, the High Court, the Crown Court, the county courts and the magistrates' courts of Northern Ireland. The Lord Chief Justice is entitled to sit on any of those courts, but routinely sits on the Court of Appeal.

Lord chief justices of Northern Ireland
The Rt Hon. Sir Denis Henry, Bt, (1922–1925)
The Rt Hon. Sir William Moore, Bt (1925–1937)
The Rt Hon. Sir James Andrews, Bt (1937–1951)
The Rt Hon. The Lord MacDermott (1951–1971)
Major The Rt Hon. The Lord Lowry (1971–1989)
The Rt Hon. Sir Brian Hutton (1989–1997)
The Rt Hon. Sir Robert Carswell (1997–2004) 
The Rt Hon. Sir Brian Kerr (2004–2009)
The Rt Hon. Sir Declan Morgan (2009–2021)
The Rt Hon. Dame Siobhan Keegan (2021-)

See also
 Lord Chief Justice of Ireland
 Lord Chief Justice of Southern Ireland
 Chief Justice of Ireland
 List of Lords Justices of Appeal of Northern Ireland
 List of High Court Judges of Northern Ireland

References

Sources
 N.C. Fleming and Alan O'Day, The Longman Handbook of Modern Irish History since 1800, N.C. Fleming and Alan O'Day, p. 420; 

Northern Ireland
Law of Northern Ireland
Bar of Northern Ireland

Lord Chief Justice
Northern Ireland law-related lists
Judiciary of Northern Ireland